The 2015-16 season saw Glasgow Warriors compete in the competitions: the Guinness Pro12 and the European Champions Cup.

Season Overview

The 2015-16 season began for Glasgow Warriors, for the first time, as defending champions.

In preparation for the defence of the title in a Rugby World Cup year - where it was expected that Glasgow Warriors would supply the majority of the Scotland side - Gregor Townsend assembled one of the biggest Professional squads in world rugby.

It was hoped that the large squad would see the Warriors through the early part of the season and provide enough impetus for a European challenge too.

Team

Coaches

 Head coach:  Gregor Townsend
 Assistant coach:   Matt Taylor
 Assistant coach:   Kenny Murray
 Assistant coach:   Dan McFarland

Squad

BT Sport Scottish Rugby Academy Stage 3 players

Scottish Rugby Academy players who have been assigned to a Professional club are Stage 3 players. These players are assigned to Glasgow Warriors for the season 2015-16.

Academy players promoted in the course of the season are listed with the main squad.

  Cameron Fenton - Prop / Hooker
  Andrew Davidson - Lock
  Callum Hunter-Hill - Lock
  Kiran McDonald - Lock
  Michael Dewar - Flanker
  Bruce Flockhart - Flanker
  Matt Smith - Flanker
  Lewis Wynne - Flanker

  George Horne - Fly-half
  Robbie Fergusson - Centre

Player statistics

During the 2015–16 season, Glasgow have used 56 different players in competitive games. The table below shows the number of appearances and points scored by each player.

Staff movements

Coaches

Personnel In

  Dan McFarland from Connacht

Personnel Out

  Shade Munro to Scotland women's national rugby union team

Player movements

Academy promotions

  Zander Fagerson from Scottish Rugby Academy
  D'Arcy Rae from Scottish Rugby Academy
  Glenn Bryce from Scottish Rugby Academy
  Fergus Scott from Scottish Rugby Academy
  George Hunter from Scottish Rugby Academy
  Ali Price from Scottish Rugby Academy
  Scott Cummings from Scottish Rugby Academy
  Nick Grigg from Scottish Rugby Academy
  James Malcolm from Scottish Rugby Academy

Player transfers

In

  Simone Favaro from  Benetton Treviso
  Grayson Hart from  Edinburgh
  Kieran Low from  London Irish
  Mike Blair from  Newcastle Falcons
  Sam Johnson from  Queensland Reds
  Greg Peterson from  Leicester Tigers
  Taqele Naiyaravoro from  NSW Waratahs
  Javan Sebastian from  Scarlets
  Jason Hill from  Heriot's Rugby Club
  Rory Clegg from  Newcastle Falcons
  Gary Strain from  Glasgow Hawks
  Steven Findlay from  Glasgow Hawks
  Mark Robertson from  Scotland 7s
  Nyle Godsmark from  Scotland 7s
  Hugh Blake from  Edinburgh
 
  Scott Wight from  Scotland 7s (loan)
  Sila Puafisi from  Gloucester Rugby
  Shalva Mamukashvili from  Sale Sharks
 
 
 
 
  Rory Clegg from  Oyonnax
  Djustice Sears-Duru from  Ontario Blues

Out

  Nikola Matawalu to  Bath Rugby
  Sean Maitland to  London Irish
  D. T. H. van der Merwe to  Scarlets
  Dougie Hall retired
  Jon Welsh to  Newcastle Falcons
  Alastair Kellock retired
  Murray McConnell to  Nottingham
  James Downey to  Wasps
  Tommy Spinks to  Jersey
  Euan Murray to  Pau
  Connor Braid to  Canada Sevens
  Rossouw de Klerk released
  Rory Clegg to  Oyonnax
 
  George Horne to  London Scottish (loan)
 
  Nyle Godsmark to  Melrose RFC
  Andy Redmayne to  Glasgow Hawks
  Scott Wight to  Scotland 7s (loan ends)
  Mark Robertson to  Scotland 7s
  Gary Strain to  Glasgow Hawks
  George Hunter to  Ayr RFC
  Rory Hughes to  London Scottish (loan)
  Kieran Low to  Saracens (loan)
  Michael Cusack to  Newcastle Falcons
  Steven Findlay to  Eastern Suburbs RUFC
 
  Mike Blair retired
  James Eddie retired
  Andrew Davidson to  Newcastle Falcons
  Jason Hill to  Bedford Blues

Competitions

Pre-season and friendlies

Match 1

Glasgow Warriors:15. Peter Murchie
14. Junior Bulumakau*
13. Glenn Bryce
12. Fraser Lyle
11. Lee Jones
10. Rory Clegg
9. Grayson Hart
1. Jerry Yanuyanutawa
2. Kevin Bryce
3. D'arcy Rae
4. James Eddie
5. Kieran Low
6. Tyrone Holmes
7. Chris Fusaro (c)
8. Jason Hill
Replacements: Mark Robertson, Nick Grigg**, Robbie Fergusson **, Nyle Godsmark, Ali Price**, Will Bordill, Simone Favaro, Scott Cummings**, Andrew Davidson**, Zander Fagerson, Pat MacArthur, Fergus Scott, George Hunter
[*  Trialist]
[** BT Sport Scottish Rugby Academy Stage 3 Player]

Clermont: 1. Thomas Domingo (c) 2. John Ulugia 3. Clément Ric 4. Paul Jedrasiak 5. Loïc Jacquet
6. Camille Gérondeau 7. Julien Bardy 8. Fritz Lee 9. Ludovic Radosavljevic 10. Camille Lopez 11. Hosea Gear 12. Benson Stanley 13. Aurélien Rougerie 14. Adrien Planté 15. Nick Abendanon
Replacements: Viktor Kolelishvili, Raphaël Chaume, Arthur Iturria, Alexandre Lapandry, Enzo Sanga, Patricio Fernandez, Pedro Bettencourt, Daniel Kötze, Etienne Falcoux, Judicaël Cancoriet, Calvonn Allison, Alexandre Nicoue, Albert VuliVuli, David Strettle

Match 2

Canada: 15 Matt Evans, 14 Jeff Hassler, 13 Ciaran Hearn, 12 Connor Braid, 11 D. T. H. van der Merwe, 10 Nathan Hirayama, 9 Phil Mack, 8 Richard Thorpe, 7 Nanyak Dala, 6 Kyle Gilmour, 5 Jamie Cudmore (c), 4 Evan Olmstead, 3 Andrew Tiedemann, 2 Benoit Piffero, 1 Djustice Sears-Duru.
Replacements: 16 Hubert Buydens, 17 Ray Barkwill, 18 Doug Wooldridge, 19 Jebb Sinclair, 20 Aaron Carpenter, 21 Jamie Mackenzie, 22 Liam Underwood, 23 Harry Jones, 24 Brett Beukeboom, 25 Phil Mackenzie.

Glasgow Warriors: 15 Peter Murchie (c), 14 Lee Jones, 13 Glenn Bryce, 12 Fraser Lyle, 11 Rory Hughes, 10 Rory Clegg, 9 Mike Blair, 8 Josh Strauss, 7 Chris Fusaro, 6 Simone Favaro, 5 Kieran Low, 4 Tim Swinson, 3 Zander Fagerson, 2 Pat MacArthur, 1 Jerry Yanuyanutawa.
Replacements (all used): George Hunter, Kevin Bryce, Mike Cusack, D'arcy Rae, Scott Cummings**, James Eddie, Will Bordill, Jason Hill, Grayson Hart, Scott Wight, Mark Robertson, Robbie Fergusson**, Junior Bulumakau.
[** BT Sport Scottish Rugby Academy Stage 3 Player]

Match 3

Glasgow Warriors:15. Glenn Bryce
14. Junior Bulumakau
13. Sam Johnson
12. Fraser Lyle
11. Lee Jones
10. Rory Clegg
9. Grayson Hart
1. Alex Allan
2. Fergus Scott
3. D'arcy Rae
4. Rob Harley (c)
5. Scott Cummings**
6. Tyrone Holmes
7. Hugh Blake
8. Adam Ashe
Replacements (all used): James Malcolm**, George Hunter, Zander Fagerson, Jason Hill, Callum Hunter-Hill**, Ali Price**, Gregor Hunter, Nick Grigg**,Chris Fusaro, James Eddie, Gary Strain, Mike Cusack, Kieran Low, Robbie Fergusson **, Nyle Godsmark, George Horne**
[** BT Sport Scottish Rugby Academy Stage 3 Player]

Army Rugby Union: 1. Dowding 2. Austin 3. Budgen 4. Jones 5. Ball
6. Koroiyadi 7. Lamont 8. Boladua 9. Chennell 10. Davies 11. Nlalaugo 12. Wessells 13. Nakamavuto 14. Watkins 15. Leatham
Replacements: Dwyer, Hamilton, McLaren, Bates, Llewellyn, Nayacavou, Vata, Prasad, O'Reilly

Pro12

At the start of the season, Glasgow Warriors were missing 21 players on Rugby World Cup duty in various international squads, more than any other club in world rugby.

That wasn't all. The Australian international, Taqele Naiyaravoro, Glasgow's marquee signing of the season, was stuck in Australia awaiting a visa. He wouldn't arrive in Glasgow until October and he played his first match against Newport Gwent Dragons on 16 October 2015.

In addition to losing players to the World Cup and visa hold-ups Glasgow had a run of injuries at the start of the season. Alex Dunbar & Sam Johnson were injured for the opener against Scarlets and that injury list grew with stand-in captain Peter Murchie being injured for 3–4 months.

A spate of injuries to Glasgow's recognised hookers caused the Warriors to sign Shalva Mamukashvili from Sale Sharks. The hooker injury list included Kevin Bryce, Fraser Brown, Pat MacArthur and new academy promotion Fergus Scott. Mamukashvili and academy players James Malcolm and Cameron Fenton were called on to avert the Hooker crisis.

The season was to get even worse for the Warriors as, due to flooding, Scotstoun became unplayable over the winter. Glasgow's 1872 Cup home match against Edinburgh Rugby was played at Murrayfield, Edinburgh's home! In addition Glasgow had to move other home matches to Rugby Park in Kilmarnock.

Losing both matches to Edinburgh left Glasgow at one point sitting 9th in the Pro12 league table. However, as the club managed to get Scotstoun playable again and their World Cup players gradually got back to domestic ways, Glasgow slowly climbed back up the table. A 9-game winning streak saw Glasgow manage to climb to the top of the table and secure a semi-final play-off place.

Away to Connacht in the final league match of the season, victory would have secured Glasgow a home semi final and first place. Instead Connacht ground out a tight match which meant Glasgow finished third; with Leinster securing top spot by a single point.

This meant that Glasgow had to travel back to Connacht for an away semi-final. Another bruising match followed with two Glasgow Warriors players Russell and Fagerson colliding when tackling Connacht's Bundee Aki in the first minutes, immediately putting Glasgow on the back foot. Russell ended in hospital - and by the end of the game Simone Favaro, Johnny Gray, D'Arcy Rae and Josh Strauss all suffered injuries. Connacht ground out another win and found themselves in the Edinburgh final against Leinster to end Glasgow's championship defence.

League table

Results

Round 1

Round 2

Round 3

Round 4

Round 5

Round 6

Round 7

Round 8

Round 9

Round 10 - 1872 Cup 1st Leg

Round 11 - 1872 Cup 2nd Leg

Edinburgh Rugby won the 1872 Cup with an aggregate score of 37 - 22.

Round 12

Round 13

Round 14

Round 15

Round 16

Round 17

Round 9 rescheduled match

This match – originally scheduled to be held during Round 9, on 5 December 2015 – was postponed due to a waterlogged pitch.

Round 18

Round 19

Round 12 rescheduled match

This match – originally scheduled to be held during Round 12, on 8 January 2016 – was postponed due to a European Rugby Champions Cup fixture rearrangement that occurred as a result of the Paris terrorist attacks in November 2015.

Round 20

Round 21

Round 22

Play-offs

Semi-final

Europe

By virtue of winning the Pro12 in 2014-15, Glasgow Warriors were seeded as top seeds in the European Champions Cup pool stages. Drawn with Racing 92, Northampton Saints and Scarlets, it was a tough group.

Townsend had predicted that four wins out of six would be needed to qualify. Glasgow secured a home win against Racing and home and away wins against Scarlets. Three wins might have been enough had the group been tighter but unfortunately Scarlets proved the whipping boy of the group and it was Glasgow's losses to Northampton Saints home and away which ended the Warriors hopes of progress.

Pool 3

Results

Round 1

Round 2

Round 3

Round 4

Round 1 rescheduled

Round 5

Round 6

Warrior of the month awards

End of Season awards

Competitive debuts this season

A player's nationality shown is taken from the nationality at the highest honour for the national side obtained; or if never capped internationally their place of birth. Senior caps take precedence over junior caps or place of birth; junior caps take precedence over place of birth. A player's nationality at debut may be different from the nationality shown. Combination sides like the British and Irish Lions or Pacific Islanders are not national sides, or nationalities.

Players in BOLD font have been capped by their senior international XV side as nationality shown.

Players in Italic font have capped either by their international 7s side; or by the international XV 'A' side as nationality shown.

Players in normal font have not been capped at senior level.

A position in parentheses indicates that the player debuted as a substitute. A player may have made a prior debut for Glasgow Warriors in a non-competitive match, 'A' match or 7s match; these matches are not listed.

Tournaments where competitive debut made:

Crosshatching indicates a jointly hosted match.

Sponsorship

 BT Sport
 Rowan Glen
 McCrea Financial Services
 Malcolm Group
 QBE Insurance
 Scot JCB

Official Kit Supplier

Macron

References

2015-16
2015–16 in Scottish rugby union
2015–16 Pro12 by team
2015–16 European Rugby Champions Cup by team